Cambridge International School may refer to:

Cambridge International School, Cambridge, a defunct international school in Cambridge, England
Cambridge International School, Dubai, an international school in Al Garhoud, United Arab Emirates
Cambridge International School, Doha
Cambridge International School (Moscow)

See also
The Cambridge School (disambiguation)